The Gurupura River (also known as Pachamagaru River, Phalguni River or Kulur River) is a river in the Karnataka state of India. It originates in the Western Ghats and is a tributary of the Netravati River, which empties into the Arabian Sea, south of Mangalore. It gets its name from the town Gurupura, situated near Mangalore. The New Mangalore Port and Mangalore Chemicals and Fertilizers are situated on its northern banks. Once upon a time it formed northern boundary of Mangalore city along with Netravati River as southern boundary but currently it forms the boundary only for the central part of Mangalore due to the growth of the city beyond these river boundaries.

Notes

See also
List of rivers of Dakshina Kannada and Udupi districts
Netravati River

Rivers of Karnataka
Geography of Dakshina Kannada district
Rivers of India